Imeneo (alternative title: Hymen, HWV 41) is an opera seria in three acts by George Frideric Handel. The Italian-language libretto was adapted from Silvio Stampiglia's Imeneo.  Handel had begun composition in September 1738, but did not complete the score until 1740.  The opera received its first performance at the Lincoln's Inn Fields in London on 22 November 1740, and received another performance on 13 December.  Handel then revised the score, and this revised version received concert performances in Dublin, on 24 and 31 March 1742.

Performance history
Charles Jennens, who created the libretti for both Saul and Messiah, described Imeneo as "the worst of all Handel’s Compositions", but added "yet half the Songs are good".

The first modern production was at the Halle Opera House on 13 March 1960, conducted by Horst-Tanu Margraf.  The work was soon after performed in Birmingham in 1961, under the direction of Anthony Lewis.  Lewis also led the first London revival of the opera since Handel's time, in 1972 at the Royal Academy of Music.  Lewis has prepared a performing edition of the opera.

Roles

Synopsis

The setting is "A Pleasant Garden" in Athens. The opera opens with Tirinto's lamentation of his lost love, Rosmene, a virgin of goddess Ceres, to barbaric pirates. Her confidant Clomiri, has also been abducted. Together he grieves with Clomiri's father, Argenio. But they learn that a brave, strong man named Imeneo has killed all of the pirates as they slept. Everyone rejoices, and Imeneo, along with the rest of the country and Rosmene's parents, expects Rosmene to marry him, though her true feelings are for Tirinto. Thus Rosmene is caught in a painfully awkward love triangle. Additionally, Clomiri has amorous feelings for Imeneo. Clomiri helps Imeneo realize that Rosmene is hesitant because of her relationship with Tirinto, and that she is putting his contentment before hers. When Imeneo, who insists that Rosmene is ungrateful, and Tirinto, who calls her unfaithful, tell her to decide who she will marry, she feigns a nervous breakdown in front of the characters. Tirinto maintains that she is out of her mind, but in the aria "Io son quella navicella" Rosmene compares herself to a storm-tossed ship coming to shore. Eventually, she marries Imeneo. She learns that true love is not as important as honor and duty. Rosmene asks Tirinto to be happy for her. Her decision leaves Clomiri and Tirinto in tears. The chorus at the end of the opera restates that one must not bow down to one's desire, but to reason; one must not follow true feelings and fidelity, but gratitude and honor.

Recordings

References
Notes

Sources
 The second of the two volume definitive reference on the operas of Handel
Imeneo by Anthony Hicks, in 'The New Grove Dictionary of Opera', ed. Stanley Sadie (London, 1992) 
Handel's 'Imeneo' From Glimmerglass Opera

External links
Score of Imeneo (ed. Friedrich Chrysander, Leipzig 1885)

Operas by George Frideric Handel
Italian-language operas
Opera seria
1740 operas
Operas